Donnaleigh Bailey (born 17 January 1983) is an English actress, known for portraying the role of Michelle Corrigan in the BBC soap opera Doctors. For her role as Michelle, she received two nominations for the British Soap Award for Best Actress. Since 2015, she has made occasional appearances in the ITV soap opera Coronation Street.

Life and career
Bailey was born in Balsall Heath, Birmingham, on 17 January 1983. She attended Bishop Challoner School and the Central Junior Television Workshop. The minimum entry age for the latter was eleven, but wanting to join sooner, she lied about her age when she was nine. Bailey's professional acting debut came in 1996 when she appeared in an episode of Dangerfield. She also made appearances in Crossroads and Holby City. Shortly after leaving drama school, she was cast as Michelle Corrigan in the BBC soap opera Doctors. Bailey revealed on her BBC profile for Doctors that when she was shopping with co-star Martha Howe-Douglas who played Donna Parmar, the two were stopped by a man who showed them a cut on his arm. Bailey said that the man "wouldn't believe that they didn't work in a surgery". This happened in another instance, this time with co-star Diane Keen: "one day Diane and I were going for lunch and saw a cyclist knocked off his bike. We ran towards him to see if we could help, but when we got to him I said, 'What can we do?'. I thought, 'This is serious, we can't pretend'. So I just rang for an ambulance. In 2010, Bailey announced her decision to leave Doctors. She felt that since she had been cast on the series straight after leaving drama school, she wanted to explore other career opportunities. On the decision to leave, she said: "It was so sad, and filming the last episode was awful. I sobbed from the first scene of the day to the very end!"

In 2011, Bailey set up kids drama workshops in Kings Heath, where she lives. In 2015, she began making occasional appearances in the ITV soap opera Coronation Street, her most notable role being Jess Heywood. Bailey's stage credits include the role of Leah in Beautiful Thing, Nikki in Redundant and Colleen in Martha Loves Michael. She is also an Open Door tutor, supporting disadvantaged students with preparation for drama school. In 2019, Bailey appeared in Casualty, as well as an episode of The Reluctant Landlord.

Filmography

Awards and nominations

References

External links
 

1983 births
21st-century English actresses
21st-century English educators
Actresses from Birmingham, West Midlands
Black British actresses
English child actresses
English television actresses
English soap opera actresses
English stage actresses
English women educators
Living people